Captain Stephen Smith (b. 1739, Sandwich, Massachusetts - 29 September 1806, Machias, Maine) was a privateer and militia leader from Machias, Maine who fought in the Raid on St. John (1775). The following year Smith was appointed truck master to the Native Americans to ensure their support during the American Revolution.  He also participated in the Battle of Machias (1777).
Stephen Smith, after the revolution was appointed by President George Washington under Treasury Secretary Alexander Hamilton in Machias as a Tax Collector.
Jim Lawrence Finnie CEO Fantast Corporation is a descendant of Stephen Smith.

References 

1739 births
1806 deaths
People from Machias, Maine
American privateers
United States Navy personnel of the American Revolution
Military personnel from Maine
People from Sandwich, Massachusetts